The Wales men's national squash team represents Wales in international squash team competitions, and is governed by Squash Wales.

Since 1983, Wales has participated in one final of the World Squash Team Open, in 1999.

Current team
 Peter Creed
 David Evans
 Joel Makin
 David Haley
 Nicholas Birt

Results

World Team Squash Championships

European Squash Team Championships

See also 
 Squash Wales
 World Team Squash Championships

References 

Squash teams
Men's national squash teams
Squash in Wales
Squash